Larchmont may refer to:

Communities
Larchmont, Houston, a neighborhood
Larchmont, Los Angeles, a neighborhood
Larchmont, New York, a village in Westchester County

Other
Larchmont (Worcester, Massachusetts), a historic house
Larchmont (Metro-North station), a railroad station in Larchmont, New York
Larchmont Chronicle, a community newspaper in Los Angeles, California
Larchmont Harbor (Long Island Sound), a bay in Westchester County, New York
Larchmont Yacht Club, in Westchester County, New York

See also
Larchmont-Edgewater